Malipur is a town in Ambedkar Nagar district. It is situated on Nawab Yusuf road between Akbarpur (20 km) and Shahganj (27 km). Malipur comes under Jalalpur tehsil and is connected to Jalalpur (12 km) by road and his (67 km)in Rajesultanpur. 

Cities and towns in Ambedkar Nagar district